Confidential is a 1935 American crime film directed by Edward L. Cahn and written by Wellyn Totman and Olive Cooper. The film stars Donald Cook, Evalyn Knapp, Theodore von Eltz, Warren Hymer, J. Carrol Naish and Herbert Rawlinson. The film was released on October 16, 1935, by Mascot Pictures.

Plot

Cast    
Donald Cook as FBI Agent Dave Elliott
Evalyn Knapp as Maxine Travers
Theodore von Eltz as Mr. Walsh
Warren Hymer as 'Midget' Regan
J. Carrol Naish as 'Lefty' Tate
Herbert Rawlinson as J.W. Keaton
Kane Richmond as J.W. 'Jack' Keaton, Jr.
Guy Edward Hearn as Insp. Stone
James P. Burtis as Lacey 
Clay Clement as Insp. Arthur M. Preston
Reed Howes as FBI Agent Bob Arnold
Morgan Wallace as H. Van Cleve
Monte Carter as Giuseppe Tomasso Giaconelli
Al Bridge as Hanover 
Earl Eby as FBI Agent Nash
Lynton Brent as FBI Agent Connors 
George Chesebro as Sardo 
Mary Gwynne as Woman
Frank Marlowe as G-Man
Lillian Castle as Mary 
Donald Kerr as Reporter
Edwin Argus as Character
Jack Gustin as Henchman
David Worth as FBI Agent
Allen Connor as Official
Tom Brower as Elderly Man
Harry Harvey, Sr. as Short Pool Player
Robert Homans as Fat Pool Player
Allan Cavan as One of Keaton's Lieutenants
Earl Dwire as Secretary
John Ince as One of Keaton's Lieutenants
Lee Phelps as One of Keaton's Lieutenants

References

External links 
 

1935 films
1930s English-language films
American crime films
1935 crime films
Mascot Pictures films
Films directed by Edward L. Cahn
American black-and-white films
Films produced by Nat Levine
1930s American films